Lake Medina Shores is a census-designated place in Bandera and Medina counties, Texas, United States. Its population was 1,235 as of the 2010 census. This was a new CDP for the 2010 census.

Demographics

2020 census

As of the 2020 United States census, there were 1,110 people, 504 households, and 355 families residing in the CDP.

Geography
Lake Medina Shores is located at  (29.637992, -98.991496).

References

Census-designated places in Bandera County, Texas
Census-designated places in Medina County, Texas
Census-designated places in Texas